Astatula is a town in Lake County, Florida, United States. The population was 1,810 at the 2010 census and an estimated 2,085 in 2019. It is part of the Orlando–Kissimmee–Sanford Metropolitan Statistical Area.

Geography
Astatula is located in central Lake County on the east side of Little Lake Harris. County Road 561 (Monroe Street) is the main road through the town; it leads north  to Tavares, the county seat, and south  to U.S. Route 27 near Minneola.

Demographics

At the 2000 census there were 1,298 people, 482 households, and 359 families in the town. The racial makeup of the town was 84.36% White, 1.23% African American, 0.54% Native American, 0.31% Asian, 10.48% from other races, and 3.08% from two or more races. Hispanic or Latino of any race were 19.41%.

Of the 482 households 33.2% had children under the age of 18 living with them, 60.0% were married couples living together, 9.3% had a female householder with no husband present, and 25.5% were non-families. 19.5% of households were one person and 9.5% were one person aged 65 or older.  The average household size was 2.69 and the average family size was 3.09.

The age distribution was 26.0% under the age of 18, 6.3% from 18 to 24, 29.4% from 25 to 44, 23.4% from 45 to 64, and 14.9% 65 or older.  The median age was 38 years. For every 100 females, there were 92.9 males.  For every 100 females age 18 and over, there were 95.5 males.

The median household income was $31,625 and the median family income  was $33,393. Males had a median income of $26,602 versus $20,313 for females. The per capita income for the town was $15,832.  About 6.8% of families and 8.0% of the population were below the poverty line, including 9.6% of those under age 18 and 4.9% of those age 65 or over.

References

Towns in Lake County, Florida
Greater Orlando
Towns in Florida